Church of the Blessed Virgin Mary of the Rosary is located in the north part of the town of Balbieriškis, Lithuania,  to the south of Prienai.

History 

The first church was built before 1520. In 1612, the second church was constructed and the owner of Balbieriškis Manor gave it to the Calvinists. Catholics, led by pastor of Merkinė, Petras Ramulavičius, took the church on February 10, 1632. In 1884–1888, a wooden church was built following the design of Bronislovas Žochovskis. Pastor Motiejus Brazauskas oversaw the reconstruction of the church in 1911–1912.

The church sustained damage during World War II and serious reconstruction was made in 1956, including replacing beams of the towers.

On the night of August 8, 2013, the church burnt down.

Rebuilding of the church 
In 2015, architect Vilius Urbonas presented design of the new church to the community of Balbieriškis. The new design had single tower and used bricks as the main building material. The church was consecrated on March 3, 2018.

Arvydas Paukštys, the founder and the owner of IoT company Teltonika, donated one million euros to the rebuilding of the church, becoming the first person in Lithuania to be named national patron.

Gallery

Old church

Current church

References

External links 
 Parrish of Balbieriškis Blessed Virgin Mary of the Rosary

Roman Catholic churches in Kaunas